Robin and the 7 Hoods is a 1964 12" vinyl LP album originally issued by Reprise as No. F-2021. Wrongly assumed to be a true soundtrack album of the film Robin and the 7 Hoods, it was advertised as "Original score from the motion picture musical comedy" which is correct. The film was made in November/December 1963 and the album was subsequently recorded at United Recording, Hollywood, in April 1964.  The scene with Frank Sinatra's vocal of "I Like to Lead When I Dance" was dropped, so only the background instrumental can be heard in the film.

On October 24, 2000, Artanis Productions, a movie production and licensing company owned by the estate of Frank Sinatra ("Artanis" is "Sinatra" spelled backwards) issued a CD (ARZ-104-2) of the album with some bonus tracks. In the sleeve notes by Charles Pignone, Frank Sinatra Jr. states that the songs were re-recorded because of the better quality attainable in a recording studio as opposed to the process used for film soundtracks.

Reception
Variety gave the album a favorable reception saying: "With such topflight funsters as Frank Sinatra, Dean Martin, Bing Crosby and Sammy Davis Jr. to warble the songs, this LP looms as a solid contender at the stores and on the air. All of ‘em have at least one good number and the overall feel of the session is upbeat. The Warner filmusical will soon be released and it could be a surprise summer winner. The LP has a fine chance on its own."

Track listing
All songs written by Jimmy Van Heusen and Sammy Cahn. All songs arranged and conducted by Nelson Riddle.

References

Reprise Records albums
1964 albums
Bing Crosby albums
Albums conducted by Nelson Riddle
Albums arranged by Nelson Riddle
Albums produced by Sonny Burke
2000 compilation albums
Compilation albums published posthumously
Frank Sinatra compilation albums